Shiki Kawabata (Kanji: 川端 志 季; Kawabata Shiki b. in Tokyo, Japan) is a Japanese writer specializing in manga.

She debuted as a manga artist in 2012 with 08:05 no Hengao-san, a short story published in a supplement of the magazine Bessatsu Margaret. Her works are framed within the shōjo genre, which is mainly aimed at a young female audience. Her first series, which started in October 2014, was voted fifth best shōjo of 2015 in Japan.

One of her most well known works is Sora wo Kakeru Yodaka (宇宙〈そら〉を駆けるよだか), first published, in serial format, in Bessatsu Margaret during 2014–2015; later compiled into three volumes by Shueisha.<ref>[https://aramajapan.com/news/sora-wo-kakeru-yodaka-adapted-live-action-series-netflix/85550/ Sora wo Kakeru Yodaka' to be adapted into a live-action series by Netflix'] (n.d.) on aramajapan</ref> As a result of the success of this work, in 2018 the media service provider Netflix produced an adaptation of Kawabata's manga in the form of a six-part live action miniseries under the title Switched, premiering on 1 August, about a teen whose 'world is turned upside down when a peer robs her of her body, her boyfriend and her identity'.

 Works 
 Manga 

 Adaptations 
 Switched (2018): miniseries based on Sora wo Kakeru Yodaka'', produced and distributed by Netflix.

References 

Anime character designers
Japanese graphic novelists
Japanese women artists
Manga artists from Tokyo
Women manga artists
Living people
People from Tokyo
Japanese female comics artists
Female comics writers
Year of birth missing (living people)